Ransley is a name which can serve as a given name and as a surname.

Notable people with the given name:
Ransley Thacker (1891–1965), British lawyer and judge
Ransley Victor Garland (born 1934), Australian politician and diplomat

Notable people with the surname:
Frank Ransley, (1897–1992), British World War I flying ace
Harry C. Ransley (1863–1941), Republican member of the United States House of Representatives from Pennsylvania
Tom Ransley (born 1985), British rower 

See also
Ransley Apartment Building, is a historic apartment building in the Walnut Hills neighborhood of Cincinnati, Ohio, United States

References